William V. Kiskaddon (December 14, 1929 – December 3, 2015) was an American politician, social worker, and engineer who served in the Washington House of Representatives and Washington State Senate as a Republican. He was an engineer for Boeing. Kiskaddon died in 2015, aged 85.

References

2015 deaths
1929 births
People from Whittier, California
Republican Party Washington (state) state senators
Republican Party members of the Washington House of Representatives